Ian Sancho Chincila (born 5 September 1992) is a Costa Rican judoka. He competed in the 2020 Summer Olympics.

His father Andrés represented Costa Rica in judo at the 1984 Summer Olympics.

References

External links
 

1992 births
Living people
Sportspeople from Kanagawa Prefecture
Judoka at the 2020 Summer Olympics
Costa Rican male judoka
Olympic judoka of Costa Rica